Shiguaignathus is an extinct genus of therocephalian therapsid that lived in what is now China during the  Late Permian. It was found in the Naobaogou Formation and is known from a partial skull. It was found to be a basal member of Akidnognathidae.

See also

 List of synapsids

References

Akidnognathids
Therocephalia genera
Fossil taxa described in 2017